Roja  was an Indian Tamil soap opera starring  Priyanka Nalkari and Sibbu Suryan. It premiered on 9 April 2018 and ended on 3 December 2022 and was produced by Saregama.

Plot
It follows an optimistic girl who was raised in an orphanage. She meets her biological father Tiger Manickam, but they are unaware of each other's identities. Roja is raised in the orphanage of Shanthamoorthy and has a sweet, kind disposition. Arjun, humble despite his wealth, is a leading criminal lawyer. Roja is looking for a lawyer to argue in a case related to Shanthamoorthy who was falsely accused and arrested for Bhaiya Ganesh's murder which was actually done by Sakshi with Priya by her side.

Arjun's family had planned his engagement with Priya (masquerading as "Fake Anu"). But Arjun loathed love and marriage because of his traumatic past including his Sakshi's betrayal Arjun's friend Venu's death. In particular, he had no desire to marry Priya. So, Arjun agrees to take up Roja's case for a condition that she would agree to a one-year contract marriage with him. After she agrees, the two go to the temple on Arjun's engagement day. The wedding takes place with the help of Roja's friend Swetha and Arjun's assistant, Naveen. After registering the marriage, Arjun and Roja reach the engagement venue and Arjun announces his marriage with Roja to his family, thereby stopping the engagement. Roja goes to Arjun's house and they both pretend to be husband and wife in front of the family. However, with the passage of time, Arjun discovers Roja's good qualities and falls in love with her. Subsequently, after a few struggles, Roja also falls in love with Arjun and the contract is terminated. The couple start their life as real husband and wife and become supportive.

Priya who calls herself Anu claims to be the daughter of Arjun's uncle Tiger Manickam and his wife Shenbagam, who is missing and presumed dead but is alive suffering memory loss. Working for a criminal mastermind Sakshi, Priya's goal is to marry Arjun's brother Ashwin, after failing to marry Arjun, and enjoy the family wealth. She is cunning but Arjun's grandmother Annapoorni and Manickam are taken in by her charm and always support her although she often humiliates Roja. While Arjun's parents Prathap and Kalpana's and Arjun's brother Ashwin support Roja, other family members dislike her. Due to unforeseen circumstances, Ashwin and Pooja marry without their families' knowledge, except Arjun, Roja, Kalpana and Shenbagam.

Priya and Sakshi intend to discredit Roja who is the real Anu, daughter of Manickam and Shenbagam and go to great lengths to remove her from the house and kill her despite multiple unsuccessful attempts. Soon, Arjun proves Shanthamoorthy's innocence in court and gets Priya and Sakshi arrested.

To release Priya from the jail Annapoorani and Manickam both fake acts and makes Roja believe her and releases Priya. Annapoorani arranges a reception and first night for Arjun and Roja. Priya and her team plants fire in the room. Somehow Arjun and Roja escape from it. But Priya falls down from the top floor and goes to Coma. Only Roja was near her, so she is framed for this. Roja goes to jail and there Sakshi along with help of Tiger Manickam often attacks Roja, but Arjun and Chandrakantha save her. For Roja's safety, Arjun kidnaps Priya. After a long battle in the court between Arjun and Tiger Manickam, Arjun makes Annapoorani, and Balu confess the truth by playing a drama that he killed Priya. But his junior Naveen brings Priya. Annapoorani is punished for 24 hours of jail for trying to kill Roja and Arjun. Priya is given bail on medical terms and Roja is released finally.

Priya brings Saraswati nurse with help of Sakshi and Divya to home to act as Shenbagam. On other hand Roja fights and performs pooja to get her mother back. While performing the final ritual Shenbagam enters and saves Roja. Eventually Shenbagam gains her old memories back and all accept Roja as Arjun's wife and first night has been arranged and Priya is furious and tries to spoil but plan is failed. Then in a function for Shenbagam, they see the true face of Priya when she plants a bomb in Shenbagam's Locket. They immediately decide to take a DNA test. To stop it, Priya starts the problem of Ashwin and Pooja's marriage. But to her shock, Annapoorani accepts their marriage and their first night is arranged.

To stop the DNA test, Priya decides to kill Roja. While Shenbagam and Roja are going in car, she stops the car and shoots Roja. But unknown to her, Arjun has changed the bullet. Chandrakantha arrests Priya. After she is arrested, Roja wakes up and Arjun makes arrangements along with Ashwin, Pooja, Naveen and makes everyone believe Roja is dead. But he informs this to all his family members except Yashoda and Balu.

Further Arjun makes Roja act as a devil to extract the truth from Priya. After scaring for two days, Priya confesses the truth to Chandrakantha and Arjun also promises to say the truth in the court. Meanwhile, Neelambari, an old rival of Priya and Roja has entered the show, digging up the past. She wants to seek revenge from Priya and Roja. With the help of her brother and Sakshi is frantically searching for grown up Priya and Roja and attacks Shanthamurthy. At last, after a lot of twists, she is arrested.

After the problems are solved, Roja tells Arjun that she is pregnant. JS, rival of Arjun as he lost against him. Anu joins as Js's junior. Now, both plan to kill Roja but their plans fail. Their plan is executed, and Roja is pushed in to river, causing her to lose her memory and she forgets Arjun and her family. There Chandrakantha introduces Jessi, a look alike of Roja. After many mishaps Roja regains her memory. Then, Roja does a pooja for the well-being of her unborn child. This pooja is often disturbed by Yashoda and Balu, who support Anu. However, with the help of Arjun and her family, Roja completes the Pooja. This irritates Anu, Yashoda and Balu. Meanwhile, Anu learns of her real parents, Jayaseelan and Kamala but Js doesn't believe Anu, sp they go to Roja to confirm about Anu. Seeing Anu, Roja's family yell at her, but Roja states that Anu is their daughter. So the family becomes happy and cares for Roja as she is the first heir of the family, leading Pooja to feel abandoned and jealous.

Cast

Main
 Priyanka Nalkari as in a dual roles
 Roja Arjun / "Real" Anu : Shenbagam and Tiger Manickam's biological elder twin daughter, Jessica's twin sister, Arjun's wife, Prathap and Kalpana's first daughter-in-law, Ashwin and Deepa's sister-in-law, Pooja co sister, Priya, Sakshi and Yasodha's arch- rival,  Velan's mother (2018-2022)
 SI. Jessica Victor / Abi : Tiger Manickam and Shenbagam's biological younger twin daughter, Arjun's sister-in-law and henchmen. Roja's estranged twin sister (2022)
 Sibbu Suryan as Advocate.  Arjun Prathap : a criminal lawyer, Prathap and Kalpana's first son, Ashwin and Deepa's brother, Roja's husband, Tiger Manickam and Shenbagam son-in-law, Pooja and Jessica's brother-in-law, Sakshi, Priya, JS, Shyam and Yasodha arch - rival, Velan's father (2018-2022)

Recurring
 Shamili Sukumar (2018-2021) → VJ Akshaya (2021-2022) as Priya / "Fake" Anu: JS's biological daughter; A money minded criminal corrupted girl, Roja and Arjun's arch-rival
 Gayatri Shastry as Kalpana: Prathap's wife; Arjun, Ashwin & Deepa's mother, Roja and Pooja's mother-in-law
 Venkat Renganathan (2018-2021) → Shankaresh Kumar (2021-2022) as Ashwin: Prathap and Kalpana's second son, Arjun and Deepa's brother, Pooja's husband, Roja's brother-in-law and henchmen.
 Smriti Kashyap as Pooja Ashwin: Purushotaman's daughter, Ashwin's wife, Arjun sister-in-law and junior lawyer, Prathap and Kalpana's second daughter-in-law, Roja co sister and henchmen. 
 Vadivukkarasi as Annapoorani : Shenbagam, Prathap and Yashodha's mother; Arjun, Roja, Jessica, Ashwin, Pooja, Deepa , Koushik and Malar's grandmother
 Dev Anand Sharma as Balachandran "Balu": Yaso's husband; Roja and Arjun's Uncle later turned arch-rival, Priya's assistant and henchmen
 Ramya Ramakrishna (2019-2021) → Kavyavarshini Arun (2021-2022) as Yashodha Balachandran "Yaso" : Annapoorani's daughter; Roja and Arjun's aunt later turned arch-rival, Priya's best friend and henchmen.
 Dr. Sharmila as Shenbagam Manickam: Annapoorani's elder daughter; Roja and Jessica's biological mother, Arjun's mother-in-law
 Rajesh as Advocate. Tiger Manickam: a criminal lawyer, Shenbagam's husband; Roja and Jessica's biological father, Arjun's father-in-law
 Sowmya Rao Nadig (2018-2019) → Sunitha (2019-2022) as Saakshi: A money minded criminal corrupted girl, Arjun and Roja's arch-rival
 Shiva Subramanian as Prathap: Annapoorani's son; Arjun, Ashwin & Deepa's father, Roja and Pooja's father-in-law.
 Rani as AC. Chandrakantha ; Arjun's best friend and henchmen
 Hussain A. K. as Navaneetha Krishnan "Naveen": Arjun's assistant and henchmen
 Latha as Canada Kamakshi : Annaporani's elder sister
 Sumathi Sri as Sumathi : Annapoorani's housemaid 
 Kavithalaya Krishnan as Purushotthaman: Pooja's father 
 Vasu Vikram as Advocate. Jayaseelan "JS": Priya's biological father; Manickam and Arjun's arch-rival
 K. Natraj as Shanthamurthy "Moorthy" : Orphanage caretaker
 Akhila Ramanamoorthy as Deepa Prathap: Arjun and Ashwin 's sister, Roja and Pooja's sister-in-law. 
 Padmini Chandrasekaran as Kamala Jayaseelan's wife, Priya's biological mother
 Shanthi Anandraj as Prema Purushotthaman: Pooja's mother 
 Paari as Malar: Yaso's daughter
 Sri Varshan Chinraj as Koushik: Yaso 's son
 P. R. Varalakshmi as Arulvakhu Amuthanayaki
 Lakesh as Shyam:  JS's henchman and Arjun's arch-rival
 Srilekha Rajendran as Devaki
 Gajesh as Jagan : Arjun's arch - rival 
 Kiruba as Rosy: Jessica's adopted mother, Victor's wife
 Raj Kapoor as Victor: Jessica's adopted father
 Sona Heiden as Neelambari : Arjun's arch - rival 
 Vijjith as Sasitharan "Sasi": Neelambari's brother, Arjun's arch - rival
 Dubbing Janaki as Baalu mother
 SVS Kumar as Baalu father
 Sasindhar Pushpalingam as Bhaya Ganesh: Priya's ex-husband (died in serial) 
 Neeshant as Santhosh
 Shwetha as Shwetha
 Geetha Narayanan as Judge
 Karthika Bose as Keerthi
 Swetha as Lakshmi 
 Vanitha Hariharan as Ponni
 Girish as Sethu 
 S.D. Ganesh as Ranjith 
 Rekha Suresh as Deivanai
 Manohar Krishna as Marudhanayagam 
 Keerthana as Arulvakhu Vedhavalli 
 Rohan as Ragu aka Sandy  
 Gowthami Vembunathan as Valli
 Vivethan Ravi as Buji: Pooja's brother

Special appearances

Production

Filming
Due to the COVID-19 outbreak in India, Roja and all other Indian television series and films production were suspended from 19 March 2020. Three months later, shooting was permitted and the team commenced filming in July. The show commenced telecasting new episodes on 27 July 2020. With the increase in COVID-19 cases in Tamil Nadu, the production was once again suspended in mid-May 2021 for a few weeks.

Crossovers and special episodes

Crossover episodes 

 Crossover with Lakshmi Stores (13-18 May 2019) (Episodes 325–331)
 Crossover with Poove Unakkaga (12-18 October 2020) (Episodes 655–660)
 Cameo crossover with Kannana Kanne and Anbe Vaa crossover

Special episodes 

 Thaaye Unakkaga 1 hour special episode on September 12, 2021, 2pm to 3pm
 Savaale Samaali 1 hour special episode on October 24, 2021, 2pm to 3pm
 Pirandhanal Vizha 1 hour special episode on January 30, 2022, 2pm to 3pm
 Thuppariya Porom 1 hour special episode on April 24, 2022, 2pm to 3pm
 Athey Kangal 1 hour special episode on July 17, 2022, 2 pm to 3pm

Adaptations

Reception

Ratings
Initially aired at afternoon 3:00 PM IST, good response for it made the channel change it to prime time of 9:00 PM IST in early 2019 but was soon shifted within three months to 7:00 PM IST. However it was again shifted to 9:00 PM IST in week 21 of 2021.

Awards and honours

References

Notes

External links 
 Official Website 
 

Sun TV original programming
2010s Tamil-language television series
2018 Tamil-language television series debuts
Tamil-language television shows
Television shows set in Tamil Nadu